The Mindovsky House is an example of Art Nouveau architecture, designed by Lev Kekushev and built by the Moscow Trading-and-Construction Joint Stock Company in 1903. It is located at 44 Povarskaya Street in the Arbat district of Moscow.

The diplomatic mission of New Zealand in the Russian Federation was housed in the building  from 1973 to 2015.

See also 
 New Zealand–Russia relations
 Diplomatic missions in Russia

References

External links 
  Embassy of New Zealand in Russia
  Mindovsky Mansion

Art Nouveau architecture in Moscow
Houses completed in 1903
Houses in Russia
Art Nouveau houses
New Zealand
Moscow
New Zealand–Russia relations